Our Home, Our Land is a compilation album released in Australia by CAAMA in 1995. It was released to celebrate the victory in the Mabo case. It focused on the importance of land to the Aboriginal and Torres Strait Islander beliefs.  It was nominated for a 1996 ARIA Award for Best Indigenous Release.

The CDs featured a mix of new and established artists. The title track was commissioned for this release. Previously recorded tracks were licensed from well known artist and some new tracks were recorded for this album. The new tracks were winners of a song contest for artist that had not been previously recorded.

The album received positive reviews. Jarrod Watt writing in the Age noted that it was "a pretty decent snapshot of the directions indigenous musicians are taking off to while keeping the traditions of the past." Sunday Age's Larry Schwartz states " It is a rich mix of talent that will delight enthusiasts."

In 2000 an illustrated book by Stephen Lalor called Our home, our land : contemporary Aboriginal music education kit was released as a resource about the cds for secondary schools.

Accolades

Track listing
 Our Home, Our Land – Various
 Mabo – Yothu Yindi
 Land Rights – Sunrize Band
 Forgotten Tribe – Coloured Stone
 Kulha Vaday – Christine Anu
 Solid Rock – Shane Howard
 Respect for Eddie Mabo – Rygela Band
 Stricken Land – Blackfire
 Angerwuy – Raven
 Our Home, Our Land (instrumental)
 Nitmiluk – Blekbala Mujik
 We Shall Cry – Warumpi Band
 This Land's Worth More than Gold and Silver – Phil Moncrieff
 Yolngu – Frances Williams
 Climbing that mountain – Amunda (with Rachel Perkins)
 From Little Things Big Things Grow – Paul Kelly and Kev Carmody with Tiddas
 A Little Drop – Minnie Read
 Big Mountain Wilpena Pound – Artoowarapana Band
 Original Aboriginal – Dave Quinlan
 Tjapwurrung country – Neil Murray
 Koiki, Father Dave and James – Peter Yanada McKenzie
 Mabo – Mills Sisters
 Nakkanya – Paul Kelly
 Our home, our land (Language version) – Buna Lawrie
Artist appearing on the first track are Lou Bennett, Sally Dastey, Amy Saunders (all from Tiddas), Kev Carmody, Archie Roach, Ruby Hunter, Bart Willoughby, Buna Lawrie, Sammy Butcher, Shane Howard and David Bridie.

References

Compilation albums by Australian artists